This is a list of films which have placed number one at the weekend box office in Italy during 2011.

References

 
 

2011
Fil
Italy